The 88th Massachusetts General Court, consisting of the Massachusetts Senate and the Massachusetts House of Representatives, met in 1867 during the governorship of Republican Alexander Bullock. Joseph Adams Pond served as president of the Senate and James M. Stone served as speaker of the House.

"In 1867 the Republican power in the Legislature was total in the Senate, 40 Republicans out of forty seats. In the House the numbers rose to 230 Republicans as against but 10 Democrats."

Senators

Representatives

See also
 40th United States Congress
 List of Massachusetts General Courts

References

Further reading
  (includes description of legislature)

External links
 
 

Political history of Massachusetts
Massachusetts legislative sessions
massachusetts
1867 in Massachusetts